Duke Ping may refer to:

Duke Ping of Chen (died 755 BC)
Duke Ping of Jin (died 532 BC)
Duke Ping of Cao (died 524 BC?)
Duke Ping of Qi (died 456 BC)